In Greek mythology, Arion or Areion, is a divinely-bred, fabulously fast, black-maned horse. He saved the life of Adrastus, king of Argos, during the war of the Seven against Thebes. 

Arion was (by most accounts) the offspring of Poseidon and Demeter. When the goddess Demeter was searching for her daughter Persephone, she was pursued by Poseidon. To escape Poseidon, Demeter turned herself into a mare and hid among the mares of Oncius, king of Thelpusa in Arcadia. But Poseidon turned himself into a stallion and mated with Demeter, producing Arion. Other accounts had Arion as the Offspring of Gaia (Earth), or of Zephyrus and a Harpy.

Arion was given to the hero Heracles who rode Arion into battle during his expedition to Elis, and also during his combat with Ares' son Cycnus. Later Heracles gave Arion to Adrastus, the king of Argos. Adrastus took Arion with him on the disastrous expedition of the Seven against Thebes. On the way to Thebes, Arion competed and finished first in the first Nemean Games. At Thebes, when the battle was lost, Arion quickly spirited his master Adrastus away from the battlefield, saving his life, when all the other leaders of the expedition were killed.

Sources

Early 
Arion is mentioned as early as in the Iliad of Homer, where he is described as the "swift horse of Adrastus, that was of heavenly stock." A scholiast on this line of the Iliad explains that Arion was the offspring of Poseidon, who in the form of a horse, mated with Fury (Ἐρινύος) by the fountain Tilphousa in Boeotia. The scholiast goes on to say that Poseidon gave  Arion to Copreus, king of Haliartus in Boeotia, who in turn gave him to Heracles, who used him to win a horse race against Ares' son Cycnus, at the shrine of Pagasaean Apollo near Troezen. Heracles then gave Arion to Adrastus, and the horse saved Adrastus' life during the war of the Seven against Thebes. According to the scholiast, "the story is in the Cyclic poets", a reference perhaps to the Cyclic Thebaid. The Hesiodic Shield of Heracles also has "the great horse, black-maned Arion" as Heracles' horse during the hero's fight with Cycnus.

A poetic fragment of Callimachus (third century BC) says:
Arion, the Arcadian horse, did not rage thus at the shrine of Apesantian Zeus.
Apesas is a hill near Nemea, and the line perhaps refers to Arion being raced during the first Nemean Games.

Strabo, Apollodorus, Pausanias
The late first-century BC to early first-century AD geographer Strabo, says that when Adrastus' chariot was wrecked (at Thebes) he escaped on Arion. The mythographer Apollodorus (first or second century), says that Poseidon sired Arion on the goddess Demeter, when "in the likeness of a Fury she consorted with him". Apollodorus also says that, in the war of the Seven against Thebes, while all the other leaders of the Argive army were killed, only Adastus survived, "saved by his horse Arion".

The second-century geographer Pausanias, by way of explaining why at Thelpusa in Arcadia, they call Demeter "Fury", gives a more complete account of the birth of Arion. According to this account, when Demeter was wandering in search of her daughter Persephone (who had been abducted by Hades), Demeter was pursued by Poseidon, "who lusted after her". To escape Poseidon, Demeter turned herself into a mare, and mingled with the mares of Oncius, the son of Apollo. But Poseidon, "realizing that he was outwitted", turned himself into a stallion and mated with Demeter. It was because of her "avenging anger" at Poseidon, that Demeter acquired the surname "Fury". Pausanias says that, according to the Thelpusians, Demeter had, by Poseidon, the horse Arion, and a sister whose name they do not "divulge to the uninitiated". Pausanias goes on to say, however, that according to Antimachus, Arion "of Thelpusa" was the offspring of Gaia (Earth). Pausanias also says that, according to "legend", during Heracles' expedition against Elis, he asked Oncus for Arion, and that Heracles rode Arion into battle when he took Elis, after which Heracles gave Arion to Adrastus. Pausanias says this explains why Antimachus said: "Adrastus was the third lord who tamed him".

Statius
Arion figures prominently in the Roman poet Statius's first-century Latin epic Thebaid. Statius gives a long description of Arion, as the horse is led out to compete in the race at the first Nemean Games:
Before them all Arion is led, conspicuous by the fire of his ruddy mane. Neptune was the horse’s father, if our elders’ tale be true. He is said to have been the first to bruise the youngling’s mouth with the bit and break him in on the sand of the shore, sparing the lash; for indeed there was no satisfying the horse’s passion to be moving and he was as changeful as a winter sea. Often he was wont to go in harness with the swimming steeds through Ionian or Libyan deep, carrying his caerulean father to every coast. Outstripped, the Clouds were amazed, East and South Winds emulously follow. Nor less was he on land, bringing Amphitryon’s son [Heracles] through deep-furrowed meadows as he fought Eurystheus’ battles; even for him he was wild and unmanageable. Later by gift of the gods he deigned to obey king Adrastus; and in the years between he had grown much tamer.

In Staius' account, Adrastus has let his son-in-law Polynices drive Arion in the race:
Prescient Arion had sensed that another driver stood pulling the reins and in his innocence had dreaded the fell son of Oedipus [Polynices]. Right from the starting line he was at odds with his burden and angry, more truculent in his ardour than of wont. The children of Inachus think him fired by desire for glory, but it is the driver he flees, the driver he threatens in his wild fury as he looks around for his master [Adrastus] all over the field; yet he is ahead of them all.

But Apollo, having promised victory to the seer Amphiaraus, raised up a snaky monster from the underworld in Arion's path, and when Arion saw the monster, he reared sending Polynices sprawling, and the driverless Arion finished first, but the victory when to Amphiaraus: "So in fair division the horse kept his glory, victory went to the seer."

Other
According to the first-century BC Latin poet Sextus Propertius, "Arion spoke". And according to the fourth-century poet Quintus Smyrnaeus, Arion was begotten by Zephyrus on a harpy.

See also
 List of fictional horses

Notes

References
 Apollodorus, Apollodorus, The Library, with an English Translation by Sir James George Frazer, F.B.A., F.R.S. in 2 Volumes. Cambridge, Massachusetts, Harvard University Press; London, William Heinemann Ltd. 1921. Online version at the Perseus Digital Library.
 Callimachus, Musaeus, Aetia, Iambi, Hecale and Other Fragments, Hero and Leander, edited and translated by C. A. Trypanis, T. Gelzer, Cedric H. Whitman, Loeb Classical Library No. 421, Cambridge, Massachusetts, Harvard University Press, 1973. Online version at Harvard University Press. .
 Frazer, J. G., Pausanias's Description of Greece. Translated with a Commentary by J. G. Frazer. Vol IV. Commentary on Books VI-VIII, Macmillan, 1898. Internet Archive, Internet Archive, Internet Archive.
 Gantz, Timothy, Early Greek Myth: A Guide to Literary and Artistic Sources, Johns Hopkins University Press, 1996, Two volumes:  (Vol. 1),  (Vol. 2).
 Grimal, Pierre, The Dictionary of Classical Mythology, Wiley-Blackwell, 1996. .
 Hard, Robin, The Routledge Handbook of Greek Mythology: Based on H.J. Rose's "Handbook of Greek Mythology", Psychology Press, 2004, . Google Books.
 Homer, The Iliad with an English Translation by A.T. Murray, Ph.D. in two volumes. Cambridge, Massachusetts, Harvard University Press; London, William Heinemann, Ltd. 1924. Online version at the Perseus Digital Library.
 Hyginus, Gaius Julius, Fabulae in Apollodorus' Library and Hyginus' Fabulae: Two Handbooks of Greek Mythology, Translated, with Introductions by R. Scott Smith and Stephen M. Trzaskoma, Hackett Publishing Company,  2007. .
 Leaf, Walter, The Iliad, Edited, with Apparatus Criticus, Prolegomena, Notes, and Appendices, Vol II, Books XIII–XXIV, second edition, London, Macmillan and Co., limited; New York, The Macmillan Company, 1902. Internet Archive.
 Most, G.W., Hesiod: The Shield, Catalogue of Women, Other Fragments, Loeb Classical Library, No. 503, Cambridge, Massachusetts, Harvard University Press, 2007, 2018. . Online version at Harvard University Press.
 Page, Denys Lionel, Sir, Select Papyri, Volume III: Poetry, translated by Denys L. Page, Loeb Classical Library No. 360, Cambridge, Massachusetts, Harvard University Press, 1941. . Online version at Harvard University Press.
 Parada, Carlos, Genealogical Guide to Greek Mythology, Jonsered, Paul Åströms Förlag, 1993. .
 Pausanias, Pausanias Description of Greece with an English Translation by W.H.S. Jones, Litt.D., and H.A. Ormerod, M.A., in 4 Volumes. Cambridge, Massachusetts, Harvard University Press; London, William Heinemann Ltd. 1918. Online version at the Perseus Digital Library.
 Propertius, Elegies Edited and translated by G. P. Goold. Loeb Classical Library 18. Cambridge, Massachusetts: Harvard University Press, 1990.  Online version at Harvard University Press.
 Quintus Smyrnaeus, Posthomerica, Edited and translated by Neil Hopkinson, Loeb Classical Library No. 19, Cambridge, Massachusetts, Harvard University Press, 2018. . Online version at Harvard University Press.
 Smith, William, Dictionary of Greek and Roman Biography and Mythology, London (1873). Online version at the Perseus Digital Library.
 Statius, Thebaid, Volume I: Thebaid: Books 1-7, edited and translated by D. R. Shackleton Bailey, Loeb Classical Library No. 207, Cambridge, Massachusetts, Harvard University Press, 2004. . Online version at Harvard University Press.
 Strabo, Geography, translated by Horace Leonard Jones; Cambridge, Massachusetts: Harvard University Press; London: William Heinemann, Ltd. (1924). Online version at the Perseus Digital Library, Books 6–14.
 Tripp, Edward, Crowell's Handbook of Classical Mythology, Thomas Y. Crowell Co; First edition (June 1970). .
 West, M. L. (2003), Greek Epic Fragments: From the Seventh to the Fifth Centuries BC, edited and translated by Martin L. West, Loeb Classical Library No. 497, Cambridge, Massachusetts, Harvard University Press, 2003.  . Online version at Harvard University Press.

External links
Theoi Project - Areion

Greek legendary creatures
Horses in mythology
Children of Poseidon
Children of Demeter
Children of the Harpies
es:Arión